= THIS IS =

- Product type: Dance music curation
- Country: United Kingdom
- Website: www.thisisofficial.com

THIS IS is a dance music curation brand in the UK that releases dance music compilation albums, curates dance music playlists and puts on live events. They were the first to stream an event live into Spotify.

THIS IS manages a series of dynamic playlists, dance music compilations, and live events.
